The Last Will and Testament of Jake Thackray is the debut album by Jake Thackray. It was produced by Norman Newell in August 1967 and released on LP that year by EMI in the UK and Philips Records in the USA. The record company, unsure of how the public would respond to Thackray's lugubrious voice accompanied only by his guitar, added orchestral arrangements by Roger Webb and Geoff Love to many of the songs.

The album is now out of print, but its songs, digitally remastered, are included in the four-CD retrospective Jake in a Box. The fourth CD of the set also contains 26 songs recorded in April 1967, including the earlier version of the album (originally mono) and 13 other tracks. They include unreleased solo (vocal and guitar) versions of all the songs that are recorded with orchestral arrangements on the album, with the exception of "The Black Swan".

The song "Lah-Di-Dah" has been covered as a duet by Petula Clark and Rod McKuen, and by the band Sky Larkin.

Musical style
The album differs from Thackray’s subsequent albums in that many of its songs feature lush orchestral accompaniment. In their book Beware of the Bull - The Enigmatic Genius of Jake Thackray, Thompson and Watterson write that the use of orchestra on "Ulysses" and "The Statues" adds appropriate touches of colour and drama, and that "The Black Swan" evokes the romantic balladry of Jacques Brel, whom Thackray admired. However, they write that other songs lose the “charming intimacy” of Thackray’s original demos, and call "Jumble Sale" a “brash and busy rumba”. The rich accompaniment meant that Thackray had to overdub his vocals, which felt unnatural to him as a solo folk singer who would commonly use a flexible tempo in his songs for dramatic or comedic effect. Future albums would feature only Thackray’s voice with little more than upright bass and guitar accompaniment, allowing him a less metrically rigid and more expressive vocal approach.

Track listing

References

External links
Track listing and sleeve notes at jakethackray.com

Jake Thackray albums
1967 debut albums
EMI Records albums
Albums produced by Norman Newell